Sedenia is a genus of moths of the family Crambidae described by Achille Guenée in 1854.

Species
Sedenia achroa Lower, 1902
Sedenia aspasta Meyrick, 1887
Sedenia atacta (Turner, 1942)
Sedenia cervalis Guenée, 1854
Sedenia erythrura Lower, 1893
Sedenia leucogramma Turner, 1937
Sedenia mesochorda Turner, 1917
Sedenia polydesma Lower, 1900
Sedenia rupalis Guenée, 1854
Sedenia xeroscopa Lower, 1900

References

Spilomelinae
Crambidae genera
Taxa named by Achille Guenée